Mungo Olayipo Oladapo Erogbogbo Bridge (born 12 September 2000) is an English footballer who plays as a defender. He is a graduate of the Aston Villa academy.

Career
Bridge was named in Villa's starting line-up for his senior debut on 8 January 2021 in an FA Cup third round tie against Liverpool.

Mungo Bridge signed his first professional contract for Aston Villa in October 2018, a contract lasting 2 and a half years. He signed his second professional contract on July the 6th, leaving the club a year later.  

On 31 August 2021, Aston Villa announced Bridge would be joining Championnat National club Annecy for the 2021–22 season. On 4 October 2021, Bridge made his debut in French football as a late substitute in a 2–0 league victory over Villefranche Beaujolais. Bridge struggled for appearances at Annecy, due to a knee injury suffered the season before. In the first half of the season, Bridge only started one game in the Coupe de France, 3–2 defeat to Rumilly-Vallières on 17 October 2021 and made two substitute appearances in the league. In January 2022, he returned to England, while still on loan with Annecy, to receive treatment and rehab. His loan was officially cancelled on 27 January 2022.

On 10 June 2022, Bridge was released by Aston Villa. In August 2022, he joined Bristol Rovers on trial basis, but was not offered a permanent contract.

In November 2022, Bridge signed for Northern Premier League Division One West club Macclesfield. He made his debut for the new club on 16 November in a 4–2 away victory over 1874 Northwich in the Cheshire Senior Cup.

Personal life 
Born in England, Bridge is of Nigerian descent.

Career statistics

{| class="wikitable" style="text-align:center"
|+ Appearances and goals by club, season and competition
|-
!rowspan="2"|Club
!rowspan="2"|Season
!colspan="3"|League
!colspan="2"|National cup
!colspan="2"|League cup
!colspan="2"|Other
!colspan="2"|Total
|-
!Division
!Apps
!Goals
!Apps
!Goals
!Apps
!Goals
!Apps
!Goals
!Apps
!Goals
|-
| rowspan="3" |Aston Villa
|2020–21
| rowspan="2" |Premier League
|0||0||1||0||0||0||colspan="2"|–||1||0
|-
|2021–22
|0||0||0||0||0||0|| colspan="2" |–||0||0
|-
! colspan="2" |Total
!0!!0!!1!!0!!0!!0!!0!!0!!1!!0
|-
|Annecy (loan)
|2021–22
|Championnat National
|2||0||1||0||colspan="2"|–||colspan="2"|–||3||0
|-
|Macclesfield
|2022–23
|Northern Premier League Division One West
|0||0||0||0||0||0||1||0||1||0

References

2000 births
Living people
English footballers
People from Daventry
Association football defenders
English sportspeople of Nigerian descent
Aston Villa F.C. players
FC Annecy players
Macclesfield F.C. players
Daventry Town F.C. players
Championnat National players
Northern Premier League players
Black British sportspeople
English expatriate footballers
English expatriate sportspeople in France
Expatriate footballers in France